Endlich Samstag! is a German television series.

See also
List of German television series

External links
 

2006 German television series debuts
2008 German television series endings
German-language television shows